The Ethiopian Patriots' Victory Day, also called Meyazia 27, is a national holiday in Ethiopia celebrating on 5 May in commemoration of the Ethiopian resistance movement Arbegnoch victory over Italian five year occupation of Ethiopia, and the return of Emperor Haile Selassie to the throne in 1941.

In Addis Ababa, government leaders, diplomats, members of Ethiopian Patriotic Association, and city residents pay tribute for Ethiopian veterans serving in the Second Italo-Ethiopian War (1935–1937) and honor with lays a wreath into memorial monuments across the city. Parades by the Ethiopian Police Orchestra Brass Band occur to mark the occasion.

References

Public holidays in Ethiopia